Sir Ywain , also known as Yvain and Owain among other spellings (Ewaine, Ivain, Ivan, Iwain, Iwein, Uwain, Uwaine, Ywan, etc.), is a Knight of the Round Table in Arthurian legend, wherein he is often the son of King Urien of Gorre and either the enchantress Modron or the sorceress Morgan le Fay. The historical Owain mab Urien, on whom the literary character is based, was the king of Rheged in Great Britain during the late 6th century.

Yvain was one of the earliest characters associated with King Arthur. He was also one of the most popular, starring in Chrétien de Troyes' late-12th-century Yvain, the Knight of the Lion and appearing prominently in many later accounts, often accompanied by his fierce pet lion. He remains Urien's son in virtually all literature in which he appears, whereas other characters in Arthurian legend based on historical figures usually lost their original familial connections in romance literature.

Medieval literature
Ywain (Yvain) takes his name from Owain mab Urien (Owain son of Urien), a historical figure of the 6th-century Brythonic kingdom of Rheged (in today's northern England and southern Scotland) at the time of the Anglo-Saxon invasion of Britain. His name was recorded in the bardic tradition of Taliesin and became a legendary character in the Welsh Triads, where his father, sister, horse and personal bard are all acclaimed but his wife Penarwan is named one of the "Three Faithless Wives of Britain", along with her sister Esyllt (Iseult, Tristan's love). In Geoffrey of Monmouth's Historia Regum Britanniae c. 1136, he is only mentioned in passing, as succeeding his uncle, Auguselus (Angusel), King of Albany (northern Scotland). 

The settlers of Brittany brought much of their insular British culture when they came to the continent, and in the 12th century, updated versions of Breton lais and stories became popular with French audiences. The French poet Chrétien de Troyes wrote the romance Yvain, the Knight of the Lion at the same time he was working on Lancelot, the Knight of the Cart during the 1170s. In it, Yvain seeks to avenge his cousin Calogrenant who had been defeated by an otherworldly knight beside a magical storm-making fountain in the forest of Brocéliande. Yvain defeats the knight, Esclados, and falls in love with his widow Laudine. With the aid of Laudine's servant Lunete, Yvain wins his lady and marries her, but his cousin Gawain convinces him to embark on chivalric adventure. Yvain's wife assents but demands he return after a set period of time, but he becomes so enthralled in his knightly exploits that he forgets his lady, and she bars him from returning. Yvain goes mad with grief and lives naked in the woods (probably the earliest instance of  a hero's mental illness in French literature, which later became a popular motif), but eventually is cured by Morgan and decides to win back his love. A lion he rescues from a dragon proves to be a loyal companion and a symbol of knightly virtue, and helps him complete his quest, which includes defeating the giant Harpins and two demons. In the end, Laudine, rescued from the stake, allows him and his lion to return to her fortress.

Chrétien's Yvain had a huge impact on the literary world; German poet Hartmann von Aue used it as the basis for his Middle High German court epic Iwein, while the author of Owain, or the Lady of the Fountain, one of the Welsh Romances included in the Mabinogion, tells essentially the same story, recasting the work in a Welsh setting. The story exists in several further versions in different languages, including the Middle English Ywain and Gawain. However, the mysterious 14th-century so-called Prose Yvain is a mostly unrelated text and not an actual prosification of Chrétien's poem. It contains only one Yvain episode, telling of his rescue of the lion, followed by several more unrelated episodes in which Yvain is no longer main character. Yvain appears also in numerous other romances. In some of them he has alternate family relations, for example his father in Sir Perceval of Galles is named Asoure and in Claris et Laris (where Yvain kills the king of Turkey, Corsabrin) he has a sister named Marine.

As Yvain the Great (or Yvain the Tall), he appears in all the 13th-century prose accounts of the Vulgate Cycle and the Post-Vulgate Cycle, and consequently in Thomas Malory's Le Morte d'Arthur. Yvain's mother is often said to be King Arthur's half-sister, making him Arthur's nephew. This sister is Morgan in the Post-Vulgate Cycle and Le Morte d'Arthur (causing Yvain to be banished from the court of Camelot after Morgan's attempts on Arthur's life), but other works name another of their siblings, such as Queen Brimesent in the Vulgate Merlin. Yvain is nephew of Morgause and King Lot, and thus cousin to Gawain, Agravain, Gaheris, Gareth and Mordred. He has a half-brother (with whom he is often confused) named Yvain the Bastard, son of Urien and his seneschal's wife (and also another half-brother named Galeguinant in the Prose Lancelot). In his version, Malory merged Yvain the Great with the character of Yvain of the White Hands, previously an unrelated Knight of the Round Table, and also made him father of Yder.

In the cyclical prose tradition, Yvain fights in Arthur's war against the Saxons (Saracens in the English versions), Lucius, Claudas and Galehaut, and undergoes in many various quests and adventures, some of these during his banishment from Camelot following the conflict between King Arthur and his mother. These include his failed attempt to defeat the evil giant Malduit (eventually slain by Bors the Younger), his participation in the liberation of the Castle of Maidens, and saving the life of a younger Mordred injured in a tournament. Yvain's importance is indicated by his close friendship with Gawain and by the passage in the Mort Artu section of the Lancelot-Grail cycle where he is one of the last to die before King Arthur at the Battle of Camlann (known as the Battle of Salisbury Plain in the romances). There, he personally kills two of Saxon leaders allied to the traitorous King Mordred and rescues the unhorsed Arthur, before Mordred himself charges his half-brother and splits his helmet and head with a two-handed powerful downwards sword blow. The scene's narration declares that, by the time of his death, Yvain "was considered to be one of the best and most valiant men in the world." The chronicle Scalacronica uses the cyclical prose narrative but vastly expands of Yvain's roles in the battle, having him replace Arthur as Mordred's slayer as well as Griflet in the final scenes.

Yvain's birth by the fay (fairy) Morgan may have its roots in Welsh legends: two of the Triads claim the goddess-like figure of Modron as his mother. Travelling through Denbighshire, Urien comes across the Ford of Barking where dogs congregate and bark for some unknown reason. Only Urien is brave enough to go near the place and there he discovers Modron, endlessly washing clothes (a scene common in Celtic legend, see Morrígan). He has his way with her, and she announces she had been destined to remain at the ford until she had conceived a son by a Christian. She tells Urien to return at the end of the year to receive his children and these are the twins Owain and Morvydd. However, Yvain is not associated with Morgan in the continental literature until the Post-Vulgate cycle. (Morgan appears in Chrétien's Knight of the Lion as a healer but the author does not imply she is the protagonist's mother.) Calogrenant or Colgrevance from Knight of the Lion is his another important cousin in the romances.

In The Dream of Rhonabwy, a Welsh tale associated with the Mabinogion, Owain is one of Arthur's top warriors and plays a game of chess against him while the Saxons prepare to fight the Battle of Badon. Three times during the game, Owain's men inform him that Arthur's squires have been slaughtering his ravens, but when Owain protests, Arthur simply responds, "Your move." Then Owain's ravens retaliate against the squires, and Owain does not stop them until Arthur crushes the chess men. The Saxon leaders arrive and ask for a truce of two weeks, and the armies move on to Cornwall. Rhonabwy, the dreamer of the Dream, awakens, and the reader is left as confused as he is. The Dream of Rhonabwy has never been satisfactorily interpreted.

Later Arthuriana
He appears in Child Ballad 34, Kemp Owyne, as the title hero, where his role is to disenchant a maiden turned into a dragon by kissing her three times. This story has no parallels in Arthurian legend, and it is not clear how he came to be attached to this story, although many other Arthur knights appear in other ballads with as little connection to their appearances in Arthurian legend.
He appears in Marion Zimmer Bradley's Mists of Avalon; but as Morgan le Fay's foster son, not her biological son.
In Bernard Cornwell's The Winter King, Owain is the chief warlord of Uther Pendragon and the champion of Dumnonia, with no connection to Morgan whatsoever; he is depicted as an accomplished and much-feared soldier, but is morally corrupt and a war profiteer. After accepting money to massacre innocent tin miners to frame a foreign power, Owain is accused of dishonour by Arthur (representing Tristan), who challenges Owain to trial-by-combat and kills him in a duel.

See also
King Arthur's family
List of characters named Ywain in Arthurian legend

References

Sources
Bromwich, Rachel (1963). Trioedd Ynys Prydein: The Triads of the Island of Britain. University Of Wales Press. .
Child, Francis James, (1965). The English and Scottish Popular Ballads, Volume I, p. 306. New York: Dover Publications.
Chrétien de Troyes; Owen, D. D. R. (translator) (1988). Arthurian Romances. Tuttle Publishing, reprinted by Everyman's Library. .
Chrétien de Troyes; Raffel, Burton (translator) (1987). Yvain, the Knight of the Lion. Yale University Press. .

External links

Yvain at The Camelot Project

Fictional characters introduced in the 12th century
Arthurian characters
Knights of the Round Table
Male characters in literature
Mental health in fiction
Mythological princes
King Arthur's family